Lady Liberty (Italian: La mortadella) is a 1971 Italian-French comedy film directed by Mario Monicelli and starring Sophia Loren, William Devane, Gigi Proietti, Susan Sarandon, Danny DeVito and Edward Herrmann in his film debut.

It was shot at the Cinecittà Studios in Rome and on location in Emilia-Romagna and New York. The film's sets were designed by the art director Mario Garbuglia.

Plot summary
Maddalena Ciarrapico arrives in New York City from Italy to get married and brings her fiancé a gift of mortadella (large Italian pork sausage) from her co-workers at the sausage factory where she used to work. But she is refused permission to bring the mortadella into the country because of the ban on meat which may contain food-borne diseases.  An indignant Maddalena refuses to hand the sausage over, staying in the customs office at the airport, sparking a diplomatic incident in which she attracts widespread sympathy and support.

Cast
 Sophia Loren as Maddalena Ciarrapico
 William Devane as Jock Fenner
 Gigi Proietti as Michael Bruni
 Beeson Carroll as Dominic
 David Doyle as O'Henry
 Danny DeVito as Fred Mancuso
 Susan Sarandon as Sally

Soundtrack
A song by Harry Nilsson, "I Guess the Lord Must Be in New York City," was included in the movie.

Reception
The New York Times was scathing in its review of the film, observing "Probably no other woman has so triumphantly survived as many rotten movies in such a short space of time as Sophia Loren". Although "the farcical premise is promising" it was "a comedy that manages to be both too serious and not serious enough and that, at no point matches the level of the humor and intelligence of its principal performance". It also questioned "the grindingly bleak New York settings in which so much of the film is set."

External links

References

1971 films
French comedy films
English-language French films
English-language Italian films
1970s Italian-language films
1971 comedy films
Films set in New York City
United Artists films
Films about immigration to the United States
Films with screenplays by Suso Cecchi d'Amico
Films directed by Mario Monicelli
Films with screenplays by Ring Lardner Jr.
Italian comedy films
Films shot at Cinecittà Studios
1970s English-language films
1970s Italian films
1970s French films